Gail Kopplin (May 20, 1939 – January 13, 2021) was a politician from the U.S. state of Nebraska.  From 2005 to 2009, he represented the 3rd District in the unicameral Nebraska Legislature.  Kopplin was a retired school administrator. 

Kopplin was born in Sterling, Nebraska and graduated from Peru State College in 1966. He attended the University of Nebraska-Lincoln, earning an education specialist certificate in 1982 and a Master's degree in education in 1988.

He was elected in 2004 to represent the 3rd Nebraska legislative district. Kopplin sat on the Education and Natural Resources committees. In 2008, he lost a re-election bid to Scott Price.

References
 

1939 births
2021 deaths
Peru State College alumni
University of Nebraska–Lincoln alumni
Nebraska state senators
People from Johnson County, Nebraska